Pilophorus may refer to:

 Pilophorus (bug)
 Pilophorus (fungus)